The Messengers is an American supernatural mystery drama television series that aired on The CW during the 2014–15 season. The series was officially picked up on May 8, 2014, and premiered on April 17, 2015. The series was cancelled by the CW on May 7, 2015, but aired all of its episodes, and concluded on July 24, 2015.

Plot
A mysterious object plummets to Earth, sending out a shock wave that causes five strangers to die, only to miraculously come back to life moments later. The members of the group are Vera (Shantel VanSanten), a struggling radio-astronomer living in New Mexico who is searching for her missing son; Erin (Sofia Black-D'Elia), a young mother in Tucson, Arizona, who is desperate to protect her seven-year-old daughter Amy from her abusive policeman ex-husband; Peter (Joel Courtney), a troubled high school student and orphan in Little Rock, Arkansas; Raul (J. D. Pardo), a federal agent in Mexico who is looking to escape his dangerous and violent undercover assignment; and Joshua (Jon Fletcher), a charismatic second-generation televangelist in Houston, Texas.

Most mysterious of all is the figure known only as The Man (Diogo Morgado), who offers Vera the location of her abducted son if she will help him with one morally complicated task. The task puts her on a collision course with Rose (Anna Diop), a nurse in Houston who has been in a coma for seven years, after being shot by an unknown hitman. Drawn together by fate and biblical prophecy, "The Messengers" soon learn that they now have supernatural gifts which might be the only hope for preventing the impending Rapture.

Cast and characters

The Messengers
The main characters of the series are the Messengers (real term: "Angels of the Apocalypse"), a group of ordinary humans chosen by God to determine if humanity is worth saving. They are hit by an energy wave from the meteorite that brought The Man to earth, which causes them to die for a few minutes. Then they awaken with strange supernatural abilities denominated as "gifts". However, their gifts have side-effects on their bodies unless the seven true Messengers are united.

Shantel VanSanten as Vera Buckley
An emotionally and financially struggling radio-astronomer who is searching for her missing son, Michael, who was kidnapped seven years earlier. After finding out her ex-boyfriend (and Michael's father), Leo Travers, carries a genetic disease, which was the reason he broke up with her, Vera decides to tell him about their kidnapped son's existence, rekindling their relationship.
Gift: spirit-walking; side-effect: If her spirit doesn't return to her body in a short time, her body dies.
J. D. Pardo as Raul Garcia
A former drug courier who became a US Federal agent to bring down the Mexican drug cartel he worked for. It is soon revealed that the detective who arrested him was the one who betrayed him to the same drug cartel. After failing to save his brother, Raul is trying to make amends with his niece, Nadia; both are initially unaware that they are biological father and daughter, but as the series progresses they learn the truth.
Gift: mind-reading and telepathy; side-effect: headaches.
Joel Courtney as Peter Moore
A troubled high school student and orphan with previous suicidal tendencies. After developing his ability, he kills one of his tormentors in self-defense and ends up on the run. When he meets the other Messengers, Peter learns the meaning of having a family and wants to make amends with his last foster parents, David and Melissa Cooper. He also develops an interest in Raul's niece, Nadia.
Gift: super strength; side-effect: emotional instability.
Jon Fletcher as Joshua Silburn Jr.
A second-generation televangelist preacher and recovered addict who struggles to find his place in the world. After he realized that his wife cheated on him with his own father (Silburn, Snr.) which makes him the possible father of her baby, Joshua leaves in anger and meets the rest of the Messengers on the way. By the end, he is the only one aware of Erin's daughter, Amy and her true self as the Antichrist.
Gift: Having psychic visions of the future; side-effect: seizures.
Sofia Black-D'Elia as Erin Calder
A young woman trying to make a new life for herself and daughter after fleeing from her abusive and controlling husband, who is a policeman, but what she doesn't know is that her own daughter is in fact the new Antichrist, the Devil's daughter. She develops an interest in Raul.
Gift: physical healing; side-effect: deterioration in her body.
Jessika Van as Koa Lin
An orphaned grifter from Hong Kong who learned everything from her father, who was murdered when she was young. She joins the team during the time they are facing the Abaddon hacker so she can regain her lost money.
Gift: shape-shifting; side-effect: losing her own memories in turn.
Winston Duke as Zahir Zakaria 
A journalist from Mali who is determined to seek justice after the Plowman brothers' agricultural experiment goes wrong in a West African village.
Gift: electricity manipulation; side-effect: unknown.

The Messengers' allies
Craig Frank as Alan Harris
Vera's assistant astronomer who was oblivious to Vera's powers and of the other Messengers as well, but is convinced that a government conspiracy is behind the recent events. However, after learning the truth from Vera, Alan became a trusted ally for the team. He has a crush on Vera.
Jennifer Griffin as Eliza Shepard
A former Messenger from a previous generation. She has been watching over the new team's activities, and she has her suspicions about Rose's activity and intentions (by deducing she is a Horseman). She is later killed by the Fairburns under the Devil's orders because she refused to tell him how the antichrist can be destroyed.
Former gift: visions (currently Joshua's gift).
Brittany O'Grady as Nadia Garcia
Raul's daughter, who she blames for her legal father's (Raul's brother, Cesar) death, especially after she found out that Raul was having an affair with her mother, Gabriela.
Justin Bruening as Leo Travers
A research scientist who dated Vera while they were attending the same university and is Michael's father. However, after being diagnosed with Huntington's disease, he broke off his relationship with Vera by claiming he'd met someone else and was unaware of his son's existence. Seven years later, he is reunited with Vera and confesses the truth about the break-up, as well as learning about their kidnapped son, leading them to rekindle their relationship.
Zeb Sanders as Michael Buckley-Travers / Brian Fairburn
Originally known as the archangel who led God's armies against Satan in ancient times, he was sent to Earth by God and ended up being reincarnated as Vera and Leo's son, who was kidnapped by The Man years ago and then given to the Fairburn family.

Army of Hell
Diogo Morgado as "The Man"
The Devil incarnate, who attempts to stop the Messengers. He cannot physically harm or kill any Messenger (or any other human being) by himself, which leads to him using and manipulating other people to try to carry out his wishes. He considers himself an admirer of the Horsemen's work, but competes with Rose Arvale (Horseman of Death) for the seals and the power of the meteorite in which the Devil was sent to Earth. The Man is also responsible for taking Vera's son, Michael, to Saint Monica.
Madison Dellamea as Amy Calder
Erin's daughter who grew up in a broken home with her parents constantly fighting before separating. She draws paintings about future events, pretending to be unconscious about what she does. What no one knows, as it is shown in the penultimate episode, is since her birth, Amy has been chosen to become the next Antichrist whose future is to cause the "lake of fire" on Earth.
Lane Garrison as Ronnie
A paranoid, abusive and stalking policeman who is Erin's ex-husband and Amy's human father. Despite recognizing his time hurting his family, he still desperately tries to be reunited with them, even if he has to use drastic methods.
Victor Slezak as Joshua Silburn Sr.
A first-generation televangelist and the father of Joshua Jr. He secretly has violent and aggressive behavior towards his son's wife, with whom he had an affair.
Miguel Martinez as "El Jefe"
A drug lord linked to Raul Garcia's past, who also has business with The Man.
Jason Dohring and Elizabeth Bogush as Jeff and Kay Fairburn
A couple who lost a child and made a deal with The Man to adopt Michael, who was kidnapped from his biological mother, Vera.

Four Horsemen
Every generation there are four people who commit a grievous sin and are assigned to become the Horsemen of the Apocalypse. Rose Arvale, the Horseman of Death, is the leader of the current generation, and they want to use The Man's meteorite as their ultimate weapon for the end of humanity. In contrast to the angel Messengers, the Horsemen immediately become aware of their powers upon a seal being broken as well as their destiny, and about each other's identity. It is also implied that all four of them are telepathic (only to each other) and can read each other's minds.
Anna Diop as Rose Arvale
A former nurse whose experience during war turned her into a cold-blood murderer with psychotic tendencies. Back from war, she started killing ill patients as an act of mercy while having an affair with a married doctor until he ended the affair to return to his wife. Feeling jealous, Rose killed the doctor's wife and kept her ring as a souvenir, completing her transformation into the Horseman of Death. Rose then decided to pose as and become the de facto leader of the Messengers as a ruse to find the other Horsemen of the Apocalypse with their help. She shelters the Messengers at a foreclosed house and uses a local eatery/bar entitled "The Last Supper Bar-Grill" as their base of operations. After she shows her true colors by killing Joshua, he is later resurrected by the Devil himself.
Abilities: use of dark magic; speaking and understanding any language (e.g. the language of the dead)
Lauren Bowles as Cindy Richards
Chosen as the Horseman of War, she is a Senator with an immense resentment against Afghanistan after her son was killed while serving in the Armed Forces.
Sam Littlefield as Leland Schiller
Chosen as the Horseman of Pestilence, he is the leader of a hacking group called "Abaddon", who wants revenge against an insurance company for denying medical treatment for his ill mother. His plan (which involved killing many innocent people) was stopped once by the Messengers, but he was later released from prison by Rose so he could choose to complete his plan, thus breaking his seal.
Riley Smith as Mark Plowman
Chosen as the Horseman of Famine, he is initially one of the chairmen of an agricultural company. He cares about the field and his workers, unlike his charismatic and unscrupulous brother Vincent, towards whom he a harbors deep resentment. It turns out that both brothers were set up as potential Horsemen of Famine, but Mark is chosen in the end when he kills his brother out of that resentment and thus (like the other three Horsemen) instantly loses his humanity and joins the Horsemen's cause.

Others

Robb Moon as the patron of the "Last Supper Bar and Grill".
Lexi Atkins as Alice, a student who attends Peter's school.
Katy Rowe as Charlotte Silburn, Joshua Jr.'s wife who is pregnant with his child despite having a short affair with her father-in-law, Joshua Snr.
Bernardo Saracino as Cesar Garcia, Raul's brother, Gabriela's husband and Nadia's legal father.
Loren Escandon as Gabriela Garcia, Cesar's widowed wife who has an extramarital affair with his brother Raul, conceiving their daughter Nadia.
Navid Negahban as the Prime Minister of Afghanistan, Senator Richards' target during her attempted assassination.
Hannah Marshall as Hope Silburn, Joshua Jr.'s sister whose father discarded her after she came out as a lesbian.
Roberta Isgreen as Margaret Schiller, Leland's late mother.
J.B. Tuttle and Fawnda McMahan as Dave and Melissa Cooper, Peter's last foster family who later returned him to Social Services because of his suicidal tendencies, but they are still in contact with him.
Jamie Bamber as Vincent Plowman, the co-chairman of Plowman Family Farms and the younger brother of Mark Plowman. He is described as unapologetic and aggressive; he is the favorite son which may uproot his ambitious plans.
Jodi Lynn Thomas as Anne Moore, Peter's biological mother who lived in psychiatric hospital until she killed herself for not having her son with her.
Jack O'Donnell as Dr. Simon, the lead scientist in charge of the Black Site Laboratory. He is one of the people in charge of investigating the Devil's meteorite, but he and his workers feel threatened by the Four Horsemen.
Toby Azeem as one of the Patient in Houston hospital in the awakening episode

Episodes

Reception

Critical reception
The Messengers has received mixed reviews from critics. Rotten Tomatoes gives the show a rating of 47% based on 17 reviews with an average rating of 5.6 out of 10. The site's consensus reads: "The Messengers flashes bursts of potential, but ultimately sags beneath derivative, muddled storytelling". Metacritic gave the show a score of 56 out of 100, based on 15 reviews, indicating "mixed or average reviews".

Release
The Messengers was scheduled to premiere on April 10, 2015, but was moved back a week to April 17, 2015. In Australia, the series premiered on FOX8 on June 3, 2015.

References

External links
 
 

2010s American drama television series
2010s American supernatural television series
2015 American television series debuts
2015 American television series endings
Apocalyptic television series
Christian fiction
The CW original programming
Fiction about the Devil
English-language television shows
Fictional depictions of the Antichrist
Historical television series
Religion in popular culture
Serial drama television series
Television series by CBS Studios
Television series by Warner Bros. Television Studios
Television series set in the 2010s
Television shows set in the United States
Television series by Thunder Road Films
Fiction about resurrection